Sujata is a 1959 Hindi language Bimal Roy film. It stars Nutan and Sunil Dutt in lead roles, supported by Shashikala, Lalita Pawar, Sulochana Latkar and Tarun Bose. Based on a Bengali short story of the same name by writer Subodh Ghosh, the film explored the situation of caste in India. The music is by S. D. Burman and the lyrics by Majrooh Sultanpuri. It was entered into the 1960 Cannes Film Festival.

Plot
Sujata is a romance between a Brahmin young man, Adheer and an untouchable woman, Sujata. It's also a story of intense emotional conflict of a mother in fully accepting an adopted daughter. The film has Mahatma Gandhi's fight against untouchability and the myth of Chandalika in Hinduism as its subtexts on the basis of which it tries to criticize the practice of untouchability in India.

Brahmin couple, Upen and Charu bring up an orphaned child and name her Sujata. Although Upen is fond of the adopted child, his wife Charu and Aunt (Adheer's mother) can never fully embrace Sujata because she was born in an untouchable's family. They keep hinting to Sujata at times that she doesn't belong amongst Brahmins. Adheer falls in love with Sujata but Charu and Aunt want Adheer to marry Charu's real daughter Rama. Sujata also admires Adheer but finding her reality of being an untouchable by birth feels at discomfort. One day, Upen's wife falls down the stairs and is rushed to the hospital. The doctors tell the family that in order to save Charu, they need the rare group blood. Only Sujata's blood matches and she willingly donates blood. When Charu become aware that her life was saved by Sujata, she realizes her mistake and accepts her as her daughter. Sujata and Adheer are then married happily by everyone's consent.

Cast
 Nutan as Sujata
 Sunil Dutt as	Adhir
 Shashikala as	Rama Chowdhury
 Lalita Pawar as	Giribala
 Tarun Bose as Upendranath Chowdhury
 Sulochana Latkar as Charumati Chowdhury
 Asit Sen as Pandit Bhavani Shankar Sharma
 Cuckoo Moray as Rama's friend singing the song "Tum Jeeoo Hazaaron Saal"

Awards
 Golden Palm - Cannes Film Festival - Nominated
Filmfare Best Movie Award - Bimal Roy - Won
 Filmfare Best Director Award - Bimal Roy - Won
 Filmfare Best Actress Award - Nutan - Won
 Filmfare Best Story Award - Subodh Ghosh - Won
 National Film Awards (1959) All India Certificate of Merit for the Third Best Feature Film

Soundtrack

References

External links
 

1959 films
1950s Hindi-language films
Films scored by S. D. Burman
Films directed by Bimal Roy
Films about the caste system in India
Films based on short fiction
Social realism in film
Third Best Feature Film National Film Award winners